Henry Mainwaring  was an Anglican priest in Ireland during the seventeenth century: the Archdeacon of Ossory from 1610 to 1636.

References

Archdeacons of Ossory
17th-century Irish Anglican priests